Government Degree College Wadpagga Peshawar is public sector college located in Wadpagga, Peshawar Khyber Pakhtunkhwa, Pakistan. The college offers programs for intermediate level, which is affiliated Board of Intermediate and Secondary Education Peshawar while for its degree programs it is affiliated with University of Peshawar.

Overview & History 
Government Degree College Wadpagga Peshawar is located on Dalazak Road at Wadpagga in the outskirts of Peshawar city. The college was built by the efforts of prominent local politician & social worker Arbab Muhammad Ayub Jan adjacent to Government Higher Secondary School.

Faculties And Departments 
The college currently have the following faculties and departments.
 Department of Botany
 Department of Chemistry
 Department of Computer Science
 Department of Economics
 Department of English
 Department of Geography
 Department of History
 Department of Islamiyat
 Department of Law
 Department of Mathematics
 Department of Pakistan Studies
 Department of Pashto
 Department of Physics
 Department of Political Science
 Department of Statistics
 Department of Urdu
 Department of Zoology

See also  
 Edwardes College Peshawar
 Islamia College Peshawar
 Government College Peshawar
 Government Superior Science College Peshawar
 Government College Hayatabad Peshawar
 Government Degree College Naguman Peshawar
 Government Degree College Mathra Peshawar
 Government Degree College Badaber Peshawar
 Government Degree College Chagarmatti Peshawar
 Government Degree College Wadpagga Peshawar
 Government Degree College Achyni Payan Peshawar

References

External links 
 Government Degree College Wadpagga Peshawar Official Website

Colleges in Peshawar
Universities and colleges in Peshawar